"Gonna Go Huntin' Tonight" is a song written and recorded by American singer-songwriter and musician Hank Williams Jr.  It was released in January 1983 as the first single from the album Strong Stuff.  The song reached number 4 on the Billboard Hot Country Singles & Tracks chart.

Chart performance

References

1983 singles
1983 songs
Hank Williams Jr. songs
Songs written by Hank Williams Jr.
Song recordings produced by Jimmy Bowen
Elektra Records singles
Curb Records singles